Hydroxycarboxylic acid receptor 3 (HCA3), also known as niacin receptor 2 (NIACR2) and GPR109B, is a protein which in humans is encoded by the HCAR3 gene. HCA3, like the other hydroxycarboxylic acid receptors HCA1 and HCA2, is a  G protein-coupled receptor (GPCR). The primary endogenous agonists of HCA3 are 3-hydroxyoctanoic acid and kynurenic acid. HCA3 is also a low-affinity biomolecular target for niacin (aka nicotinic acid).

References

External links

Further reading 

 
 
 
 
 
 
 

G protein-coupled receptors